Jean-Marie Dauris (born: 16 October 1972) is a sailor from Arcachon, France, who represented his country at the 2000 Summer Olympics in Sydney, Australia as crew member in the Soling. With helmsman Philippe Presti and crewmate Pascal Rambeau they took tenth place.

References

Living people
1972 births
Sailors at the 2000 Summer Olympics – Soling
Olympic sailors of France
People from Arcachon
French male sailors (sport)
Sportspeople from Gironde